Valle Caudina (Caudine Valley) is a densely settled Italian valley with about 69,000 inhabitants. It is located in Campania, between the Province of Benevento and the Province of Avellino.

Comunes
In the Valle Caudina there are 14 Italian comunes (10 belonging to Benevento and 4 to Avellino).

In the province of Avellino:
 Cervinara
 Rotondi
 Roccabascerana*
 San Martino Valle Caudina
In the province of Benevento:
 Airola
 Arpaia
 Bonea
 Bucciano
 Forchia
 Moiano
 Montesarchio
 Pannarano* (enclave in the province of Avellino)
 Paolisi
 Sant'Agata de' Goti*

The comunes with "*" are located in the outskirts of the Valle Caudina (without them the population of the valley is of 52,000 circa).

Geography

Valle Caudina is in the center of Campania being surrounded from the south by Partenio and from the north by Taburnus massif. It is about 20 km from Benevento, 23 km from Avellino, 22 km from Caserta, 38 km from Napoli e 57 km from Salerno.

The main west entrance is the Stretta di Arpaia, where the Battle of the Caudine Forks may have happened, between the mountains Tairano and Castello; another is the Moiano's gorge. Instead, the east entrance is the passo of Sferracavallo in the comune of Montesarchio.

The Valle Caudina is mostly flat and it is crossed by the Isclero river.

History
Originally, in the valley there was a lake fed by the waters coming from the Taburnus and the Partenio.
Ceramic remnants at San Martino Valle Caudina suggest early settlements dating back to the Bronze Age (1800-1000 BC). Around the 8th century BC, the city of Caudium was born. It was the capital of the Caudini tribe, remembered above all for the humiliating defeat of the Caudine Forks that the Samnites inflicted on the Romans in 321 BC during the Samnite Wars.

Bibliography
Guida d'Italia - Campania, Touring Club Italiano, Milano 2005

Sources
 Valle Caudina website

Cities and towns in Campania
Campania
Samnium